Aivar, also known as Ivar, is a 2011 Indian Tamil language comedy drama buddy film directed by N. Priyan. The film stars newcomers Vijay Anand, Ila, Perarasan, Hussain and Athulya, with Sriman, Harish, Nambi Seenivasan, Prabhakar, Jayashree, Indhulekha, Bava Lakshmanan, V. M. Subburaj, Kovai Senthil and Kottai Perumal playing supporting roles. The film had musical score by Kavi Periyathambi and was released on 11 March 2011.

Plot
In Tiruvannamalai, Viji (Vijay Anand), Ila (Jinga), Surya (Perarasan) and Sundaram (Hussain) are best friends and jobless youngsters. They love drinking alcohol so they often lie to their family and they give them money. Whereas in Arakandanalur, Ramana (Sriman) is a wealthy rice mill owner and lives with his sister Soundarya (Athulya). His best friend is Thiru (Harish) and he can do anything for him thus it makes his family jealous. Ramana then marries Dakshayani (Jayashree).

One year later, Ramana cannot digest that Thiru betrayed him so he becomes a drunkard. Surya falls in love with Soundarya at first sight. One day, Ramana and the four friends have an altercation in a bar. Later, Jinga has stomach pain and he is rushed to the hospital. There, the doctor informs them that Jinga has a tumour in his stomach and it has to be removed immediately. Jinga's family has no money for the operation, so his friends ask money to their family but they don't believe them and refuse to give money. At the hospital, Ramana feels bad for Jinga and pays for his operation. Thereafter, the four friends decide to earn money and Ramana helps them financially to start a business. The four friends feel sorry for Ramana because of his drinking habits and Soundarya tells them the reason. Ramana's family and his wife felt jealous about Thiru and they tried to brainwash Ramana. When Thiru came to know about it, he decided to break their friendship.

The four friends try their best to save Ramana and Thiru's friendship. Ramana eventually makes up with Thiru and Soundarya accepts Surya's love.

Cast

Vijay Anand as Viji
Ila as Jinga
Perarasan as Surya
Hussain as Sundaram
Athulya as Soundarya
Sriman as Ramana
Harish as Thiru
Nambi Seenivasan
Prabhakar as Prabhakar
Jayashree as Dakshayani
Indhulekha as Malliga
Bava Lakshmanan as Malliga's husband
V. M. Subburaj
Kovai Senthil
Kottai Perumal as Tea master

Production
N. Priyan, who assisted leading directors like Aabavanan, Ezhil and Badri made his directorial debut with Aivar under the banner of AGR Right Films. Newcomers Vijay Anand, Ila, Perarasan, Hussain and Athulya were cast to play the lead roles while Sriman, Harish, Jayashree and many others have performed in prominent roles. D. Sai Prasad took care of the dialogues and screenplay while Suryan FM fame Kavi Periyathambi had scored music for the film.

Soundtrack

The soundtrack was composed by Kavi Periyathambi. The soundtrack, released in 2010, features 7 tracks written by Palani Bharathi, Na. Muthukumar and Kavi Periyathambi.

Release
Initially, the film had its release date fixed on 11 February 2011, but it was released the following week on 11 March 2011.

Rohit Ramachandran of Nowrunning.com rated the film 2.75 out of 5 and wrote, "Sandwiched between a crass beginning and a maudlin ending, Ivar is a simple, light-hearted and honest film". Kungumam gave the film a positive review. In contrast, Dinamalar gave the film a mixed review.

References

2011 films
2010s Tamil-language films
Indian buddy comedy-drama films
2011 comedy-drama films
2010s buddy comedy-drama films